Ján Langoš (2 August 1946, in Banská Bystrica – 15 June 2006, in Drienovec) was a Slovak politician associated with the Democratic Party.

He was one of the key dissidents during the era of Communist Czechoslovakia. He served as a minister at Department of Home Affairs (1990–1992) of former Czech and Slovak Federative Republic, appointed by president Václav Havel. After the dissolution of Czechoslovakia he was a member of Parliament and established the Democratic Party. After many years of conviction he succeeded in establishing the National Memory Institute. After finding documentations of crimes of several influential people and trying to open these to public, he died in a car accident.

The 14th Dalai Lama of Tibet was awarded the Ján Langoš Human Rights award in Bratislava, Slovakia by Jan Langos Foundation on 9 September 2009. The Foundation was established by his wife, Gabriela Langošová and his two daughters, Nina and Bipula.

References

External links
 Article about Ján Langoš at radio.cz
 Ján Langoš Foundation homepage

1946 births
2006 deaths
Politicians from Banská Bystrica
Democratic Party (Slovakia, 1989) politicians
Interior ministers
Government ministers of Czechoslovakia
Road incident deaths in Slovakia
Members of the National Council (Slovakia) 1994-1998
Members of the National Council (Slovakia) 1998-2002